Arinna was the major cult center of the Hittite sun-goddess known as dUTU URUArinna or "Sun-Goddess of Arinna", who is also sometimes identified as Arinniti or as Wuru(n)šemu. Arinna was located near Hattusa, the Hittite capital.

The Sun-Goddess of Arinna is the most important one of three important solar deities of the Hittite pantheon, besides dUTU nepisas 'the sun of the sky' and dUTU taknas 'the sun of the earth'.

She was considered to be the chief deity in some sources, in place of her husband. Her consort was the Storm-God; they and their children were all derived from the former Hattic pantheon.

The goddess was also perceived to be a paramount chthonic or earth goddess. She becomes largely syncretised with the Hurrian goddess Hebat, as the Hittite Storm-God was with Teshub.

In the late 14th century BC, King Mursili II was particularly devoted to the Sun-Goddess of Arinna.

See also

 Hittite mythology
 Alaca Höyük

References

Literature
 Hans G. Güterbock, An Addition to the Prayer of Muršili to the Sungoddess and Its Implications, Anatolian Studies (1980).

Earth goddesses
Hittite deities
Solar goddesses